The 2018 election for Mayor of Newark took place in Newark, the most populous city in New Jersey, USA, on May 8, 2018. Elections for all seats on the nine member Municipal Council of Newark was held the same day. A runoff election, if necessary, would have taken place on June 5, 2018. Elections are non-partisan and candidates are not listed by political party. Incumbent Mayor Ras Baraka avoided a runoff after winning a second term with 77 percent of the votes.

Candidates
The deadline for candidates to file for election is March 5, 2018, at which time each potential candidate must submit a petition signed by at least 1413 voters. 
As of Monday January 8, 2018 six people had requested petitions necessary to mount a mayoral campaign:
 Abdush Shahid Ahmad
 Ras Baraka, incumbent Mayor
 Darnella A. Lee
 Sheila A. Montague

By election day, however, Newark councilwoman Gayle Chaneyfield Jenkins, who had entered the race on January 9, 2018, was Mayor Baraka's only challenger.

Results

See also
 2014 Newark mayoral election

References

External links 
Ballotpedia Newark 2018

May 2018 events in the United States
2018
Newark
Newark